Belmore State Forest is located in Clay County, Florida.

The forest comprises two separated tracts totaling 12,262 acres. The northern Satsuma Tract abuts a portion of Camp Blanding, and the southern 8,737-acre Ates Creek Tract is located near the northern part of Etoniah Creek State Forest.

See also
List of Florida state forests
List of Florida state parks

References

External links

 Belmore State Forest - official site

Florida state forests
Protected areas of Clay County, Florida